TERON is a foundation dedicated to the assessment of tillage related erosion in Europe.

See also

 Conservation biology
 Environmental protection
 Habitat conservation
 Natural environment
 Natural resource
 Sustainability
 Tillage erosion

External links
 http://www.ex.ac.uk/~yszhang/teron/
 https://web.archive.org/web/20060603160639/http://www.fi.cnr.it/irpi/teron.htm

Agricultural organizations